George Harris is an American former Negro league second baseman who played in the 1930s.

Harris played for the Louisville Black Caps in 1932. In six recorded games, he posted one hit in 17 plate appearances.

References

External links
 and Seamheads

Year of birth missing
Place of birth missing
Louisville Black Caps players